Real World Golf is a video game developed by In2Games. It was published by Valcon Games in Europe in 2005 and by Mad Catz in the U.S. in 2006.

Reception
The game received generally favorable reviews according to the review aggregator website Metacritic. Stuart Miles of The Times gave the PlayStation 2 version five stars. Paul Katz of Entertainment Weekly gave the game a B, saying that "while the Game-track is a techno marvel, it's the video game portion that still needs work." Jason Hill of The Sydney Morning Herald gave the PC and PlayStation 2 versions three out of five, saying that "any golfer will be able to pick up and play in seconds, and the sensation of playing real golf is astonishing. Pity the software simulation is so drab".

References

External links
 

2005 video games
Golf video games
PlayStation 2 games
Valcon Games games
Video games developed in the United Kingdom
Windows games
Xbox games